Baron Ironblood is a fictional character from Action Force, the British equivalent to the G.I. Joe franchise. He appeared in the Battle Action Force comic books and annuals of the 1980s and was cast as an action figure by toy-makers Palitoy and distributed around Europe.

In West Germany, he was known as Baron Eisenblut.

Character

Baron Ironblood is the leader of the Red Shadows, sworn enemies of Action Force. According to Battle Action Force his real name and birthplace are unknown (though a detailed comic book back-story, which featured in the 1985 Battle Action Force annual, places him of possible Swiss descent).
 
It provisionally identifies him as 'Marcus Kassells', 
the son of a Swiss diplomat who 
was raised and educated in Britain, attending Eton college. After compulsory national 
service in the British Army's Parachute Regiment (marred by an unproven allegation of 
the murder of a fellow officer who fell from the escape hatch of a plane after an argument)
Kassells studied nuclear physics at Trinity College Cambridge. However rather than pursuing
a scientific career Kassells joined the US Army and led his own unit during the Korean War
nicknamed 'The Baron's Brigade', specialising in behind-the-lines revenge operations. Accused
of the massacre of six peasants Kassells subsequently disappeared. Afterwards rumours
began to circulate of an ex-British Army officer using the pseudonym 
'The Baron' fighting as a mercenary in various African and South American conflicts, eventually
forming his own private army. Towards the end of the Vietnam War numerous rockets which fell
on American positions bore the inscription 'Sanguineo Ferris', the ancient motto of the Kassells
family, literally translated as 'Our blood is of iron'.
He is described as a man of scholarly tastes with a passion for chess, wine and horticulture but prone to violent outbursts of anger.

In addition, Ironblood's datafile (as it appeared in Battle Action Force) states that his "primary military speciality" is organisational military strategy and that his "secondary military speciality" is that he is a born leader.

Ironblood was said to be...

Twisted criminal brain dreams of world dominance. Noted for hypnotic control over men, his madness leads to wild fury in defeat, often taken out on his own troops.

He is also described as a:

Genius of Evil. Ironblood's sworn intent is to destroy all organised government in Europe.

Ironblood was said to be the culprit of several armed revolutions in Latin America and was previously a South American-based warlord. In addition, he uses hypnotic control to indoctrinate the Red Shadow soldiers.

Graphic representation
Both as an action figure and comic book character (first drawn by artist Jim Watson in a strip written by Gerry Day) Baron Ironblood appears dressed in all white suit (jacket and trousers) with a red 'V' design on the torso, together with a skull and crossbones decoration, the insignia of the Red Shadows. He also wears long black boots, reminiscent of German military uniforms of World War II. Various editions of the figure were produced with either black or white gloves.

Ironblood wears a Ned Kelly-style iron helmet, with a small slot opening for vision. As an action figure this helmet is removable, revealing a Caucasian male with white hair and a dark goatee beard. This representation is also clear in his early appearances in the Battle Action Force comics and in the action figure.

He also comes armed with an Uzi.

Transition to Cobra Commander
In 1985, Hasbro began moves to market G.I. Joe in the UK, under the Action Force name. This would affect the comic version of Battle Action Force, as the writers were to get rid of the Red Shadows and Baron Ironblood and replace them with Cobra and Cobra Commander.

To preserve continuity within the comic, the decision was made to transform Baron Ironblood in to the Action Force version of Cobra Commander.

The transition came as Baron Ironblood grew tired of his group's failures and decided to destroy the Red Shadows, by secretly informing Action Force of the group's bases. Going into hiding, Ironblood relocated to Southeast Asia, where he had plastic surgery on his face, constructed a new mask and costumed identity (that of Cobra Commander), and underwent extensive treatment to give him immunity towards all forms of snake venom (a process known as mithridatism). He then began the process of recruiting a new inner circle and organisation, known as Cobra.

Unfortunately for Ironblood, his illicit fortune to finance this new army is stolen by former Red Shadow member, Red Jackal, who he is forced to rebuild as a cyborg (and rechristened as "Destro"). Furthermore, both surviving members of the Red Shadows and the retooled Action Force repeatedly foil his plans.

In the final Battle Action Force storyline, after an attempt to locate the headquarters of the Action Force team fails and leads to a crushing defeat of his forces, Ironblood/Cobra Commander goes insane and collapses into a near catatonic state.

Other media

Comics

Toys

The original Baron Ironblood figure, released in 1983, featured white gloves and an Uzi while the second variant of the figure had black gloves. A third variant also had black gloves but had a Palitoy Star Wars Han Solo blaster.

In March 2012, at the 'Roll Out Roll Call' convention, the Action Force fan-site 'Blood for the Baron' released a convention exclusive action figure of Baron Ironblood to commemorate the 30th anniversary of Action Force and the 9th anniversary of the website.

References

Action Force characters
Fictional commanders
Fictional dictators
Fictional mass murderers
Fictional private military members
Fictional warlords